The University of Wisconsin–Oshkosh Titans (casually known as the UW-Oshkosh Titans) are the athletic teams of the University of Wisconsin–Oshkosh. The Titans athletic teams compete in NCAA Division III.

National championships

Team

Individual teams

Football

Basketball

Track and Field

Baseball

Notable alumni
Marty Below, member of the College Football Hall of Fame
Doe Boyland, Major League Baseball first baseman
Ron Cardo, former head coach at UW-Oshkosh
Pahl Davis, American football player
Claire Decker, NASCAR driver
Norm DeBriyn (1963), head baseball coach at the University of Arkansas
Jim Gantner (attended until 1974), former Milwaukee Brewers second baseman
Terry Jorgensen, baseball player
Tim Jorgensen, baseball player
Rube Lautenschlager, basketball player
Lester Leitl, football coach
Jim Magnuson, baseball player
Dan Neumeier, baseball player
Allison Pottinger, curler
Hal Robl, NFL player
Eric Schafer, professional MMA fighter
Eber Simpson, NFL player
Jack Taschner, baseball relief pitcher
John Thome, Football Coach
Gary Varsho (attended until 1982), Major League Baseball outfielder
Jarrod Washburn (attended until 1995), Major League Baseball pitcher
Milt Wilson, professional football player

References

External links